Shake It Up is the fourth studio album by American rock band the Cars, released on November 6, 1981, by Elektra Records. It was the last Cars record to be produced by Roy Thomas Baker. A much more pop-oriented album than its predecessor, its title track became the band's first Billboard top-10 single. Spin magazine included it on their "50 Best Albums of 1981" list.  In 2021, Rhino Entertainment re-released the album on neon green vinyl.

Track listing

Personnel
 Ric Ocasek – rhythm guitar, lead vocals (1, 2, 3, 4, 6, 9)
 Elliot Easton – lead guitar, backing vocals
 Benjamin Orr – bass guitar, lead vocals (5, 7, 8)
 David Robinson – drums, percussion
 Greg Hawkes – keyboards, backing vocals

Production
 The Cars – arrangements
 Roy Thomas Baker – producer
 Ian Taylor – recording
 Thom Moore – assistant engineer 
 Walter Turbitt – assistant engineer
 George Marino – mastering at Sterling Sound (New York, NY).
 David Robinson – cover design 
 Clint Clemens – photography

Charts

Weekly charts

Year-end charts

Certifications

References

Bibliography

 

1981 albums
Albums produced by Roy Thomas Baker
The Cars albums
Elektra Records albums